1-Butanethiol, also known as butyl mercaptan, is a volatile, clear to yellowish liquid with a fetid (extremely foul-smelling) odor, commonly described as "skunk" odor. In fact, 1-butanethiol is structurally similar to several major constituents of a skunk's defensive spray but is not actually present in the spray. The scent of 1-butanethiol is so strong that the human nose can easily detect it in the air at concentrations as low as 10 parts per billion. The threshold level for 1-butanethiol is reported as 1.4 ppb

Chemistry
1-Butanethiol is chemically classified among the thiols, which are organic compounds with molecular formulas and structural formulas similar to alcohols, except that the sulfur-containing sulfhydryl group (-SH) replaces the oxygen-containing hydroxyl group (-OH) in the molecule. 1-Butanethiol's basic molecular formula is C4H9SH, and its structural formula is similar to that of the alcohol n-butanol. 1-Butanethiol is prepared by the free radical catalyzed addition of hydrogen sulfide to 1-butene.  Commercially, this is performed using ultraviolet light.  1-Butanethiol is a thiol of low molecular weight, and it is highly flammable.

Uses
1-Butanethiol is used as an industrial solvent, and as an intermediate for cotton defoliants. It is sometimes placed in the "stink bombs" and "stink perfumes" for pranksters.

Safety
1-Butanethiol is a very noxious and caustic chemical compound, and at sufficiently high concentrations, it produces serious health effects in both humans and animals, especially as a result of prolonged exposure.  Higher concentrations can lead to unconsciousness and coma after prolonged exposure. Contact with the skin and mucous membranes causes burns, and contact with the eyes can lead to blurred vision or complete blindness.

Inhalation may cause weakness, confusion, cough, dizziness, drowsiness, headache, nausea, vomiting, and shortness of breath. The substance irritates the eyes, the skin, and the respiratory tract.  It may cause effects on the thyroid and the nervous system and could cause lowering of consciousness.

See also
 tert-Butylthiol (tert-butyl mercaptan)

Notes

References
 U.S. Department of Labor 
 The Good Scents Company
 HazMap

External links
 The Skunk's Defensive Secretion
 CDC - NIOSH Pocket Guide to Chemical Hazards

Alkanethiols
Foul-smelling chemicals
Butyl compounds